The Decent One is a 2014 German-Austrian-Israeli documentary directed by  about Heinrich Himmler.  The film was based on a cache of letters and diary entries that were purchased by Lapa's parents and published in the German newspaper Die Welt.  It premiered at the Berlin International Film Festival and received mixed reviews.

Synopsis 
The documentary examines Heinrich Himmler's life through readings of diary entries, letters, and memos. Early in his life, Himmler records in his diary that he wishes to fight in World War I but regrets that he is too young to see action. Later, when he attends college, he expresses anti-Semitic views and complains that nobody likes him.  In his 20s, he joins the Schutzstaffel. He eventually falls in love with his future wife Margarete "Marga" Boden, and the two exchange letters to each other that are sequentially numbered. Exchanges with his daughter Gudrun are also featured, as well as her own diary entries. When World War II begins, Himmler writes to his wife and vaguely references his duties, and the two complain that they have little time to see each other. Later letters discuss Himmler's affair with Hedwig Potthast, his secretary. Internal Nazi memos reveal bits of Himmler's philosophy, including the title of the documentary itself, a reference to Himmler's belief that the SS is composed of "decent men". Himmler states that the moral qualms that the SS officers feel about their duties prove that they are more moral than the Jews, and they will be remembered for their decency.

Cast 
 Tobias Moretti as Heinrich Himmler
 Lenz Moretti as younger Heinrich Himmler
 Sophie Rois as Margarete Himmler
 Antonia Moretti as Gudrun Himmler
 Lotte Ledl as Hedwig Potthast
 Florentín Groll as Gebhard Himmler
 Pauline Knof as Anna Himmler

Production 
US Army soldiers seized the documents used in the film from the Himmler household.  Against orders, they failed to hand over the evidence to their superiors and divided it into two groups: early life and contemporary documents.  The early life documents were eventually sold to the Hoover Institution, but the contemporary documents have no recorded trail until  Chaim Rosenthal, an Israeli artist and diplomat, acquired them.  Rosenthal announced in 1982 that he had purchased the letters from an adjutant to Karl Wolff, though he is rumored to have purchased them in America; the Times of Israel tracks his purchase potentially to an American flea market in the 1960s.  Philip Oltermann wrote in The Guardian that the documents failed to generate much interest because of the faked Hitler Diaries.  However, Himmler's documents were later authenticated by the German Federal Archives.  In 2006, Lapa's parents purchased the later documents with the intention of having their daughter create a documentary based on them.  Lapa said that her generation was the first one far removed enough from the Holocaust to be able to make the film.

Release 
The Decent One premiered at the Berlin International Film Festival.  Lapa, her parents, and her grandparents attended the premiere; Katrin Himmler also appeared and discussed her great-uncle.   Timed with the release of the film,  the German newspaper Die Welt controversially published several of the documents to accusations of sensationalism.  Also timed with the release of the film, Katrin Himmler co-wrote a book, Himmler Privat.  Kino Lorber released the film in the United States on October 1, 2014.

Reception 
Rotten Tomatoes, a review aggregator, reports that 67% of 18 surveyed critics gave the film a positive review; the average rating was 6.8/10.  Metacritic rated it 55/100 based on 11 reviews.   Writing in Variety, Joe Leydon called it "a fascinating portrait" that distinguishes itself by its novelty value.  Leydon said that the choice to add sound effects to the archival footage makes their use heavy-handed.  Jordan Mintzer of The Hollywood Reporter wrote that the film will interest historians and enthusiasts, though "the household anecdotes can grow tiring" and called the use of sound effects "cinematic overkill".  Nicolas Rapold of The New York Times wrote, "[T]he voice-over-driven readings and the illustrative footage – unwisely augmented with new sound effects – lack a fundamental filmic momentum."  Robert Abele of the Los Angeles Times also criticized the use of sound effects for the archival footage, but wrote, "At its most effective, though, The Decent One reveals a psychological portrait of a man devoted to his family yet consumed by a soul-blackening and horrifically destructive cause."  The Village Voices Simon Abrams called the documentary's focus on Himmler's family life "myopic" and wrote that it illuminates nothing but "unexamined hatred".  Writing in Salon.com, Andrew O'Hehir called it "the most haunting documentary I’ve ever seen".  Keith Uhlich of Time Out New York rated it 3/5 stars and said of the sound effects, "History shouldn’t be slicked up with Dolby, especially when, as here, it's so enlightening of the depths to which the human soul can sink."  Lisa Barnard of The Toronto Star rated it 2.5/4 stars and wrote, "Lapa leaves it to us to determine how a man could be so unaware of his moral failings, but some perspective from the filmmaker would have been helpful."  Brad Wheeler of The Globe and Mail also rated it 2.5/4 stars, writing, "The director sometimes ham-handedly embellishes the readings of notes written by Himmler, his wife, his mistress and his daughter with music and sound effects, but the film works best when it is at its most austere."   Hannah Brown of The Jerusalem Post wrote, "It's a virtuoso feat of documentary filmmaking, but one that is both  disturbing and demanding."

References

External links 
 

2014 films
2014 documentary films
Austrian documentary films
German documentary films
Israeli documentary films
2010s German-language films
Documentary films about the Holocaust
Documentary films about Nazis
Documentary films about politicians
Heinrich Himmler
2010s English-language films
2010s German films